1820 Naval Air Squadron (1820 NAS) was a Naval Air Squadron of the Royal Navy's Fleet Air Arm.

However its aircraft were judged unsatisfactory for their intended role and the squadron disbanded on 16 December 1944 at RNAS Burscough.

The squadron only flew one type of aircraft, the Curtiss Helldiver I.

Notes

References

External links
 

1800 series Fleet Air Arm squadrons
Military units and formations established in 1944